Moondyne Cave is a karst cave in the South West region of Western Australia.

Moondyne Cave was discovered in 1881 by Joseph Bolitho Johns, who had formerly been the bushranger known as Moondyne Joe. It was first opened for public viewing in 1911. Guided tours ended in 1959, but it was reopened in 1992 after undergoing restoration.

See also
 List of caves in Australia

References

Show caves in Australia
Limestone caves
Caves of Western Australia
Leeuwin-Naturaliste National Park